Sufian railway station (Persian:ايستگاه راه آهن صوفیان, Istgah-e Rah Ahan-e Sufian) is located southeast of Sufian, East Azerbaijan Province. The station is owned by IRI Railway. The station serves the town of Sufian.

References

External links

Railway stations in Iran